Cliniodes beckeralis is a moth in the family Crambidae. It was described by James E. Hayden in 2011. It is found in Colima in coastal western Mexico.

The length of the forewings is about 12 mm for males and 12–14 mm for females. The forewings are white with black and dark grey lines and postmedial area. The costa is dark brownish grey and the basal area is white. The hindwings are white. Adults have been recorded on wing in June.

Etymology
The species is named for Dr. Vitor Osmar Becker.

References

Moths described in 2011
Eurrhypini